Hilde and the Volkswagen is a 1936 German comedy film directed by Heinz Paul and starring Ludwig Manfred Lommel, Grethe Weiser and Hilde Schneider. It was shot at the Terra Studios in Berlin.

Cast
 Ludwig Manfred Lommel as Buchhalter Lohbusch
 Grethe Weiser as Nelly Hopp
 Hilde Schneider as Hilde Lenz
 Frank Zimmermann
 Friedl Haerlin as Hella Lenius
 Walter Steinbeck as Direktor Scheffel
 Werner Stock as Nellys Bruder
 Gerhard Dammann as Aktuar Kramer
 Ethel Reschke as Hildes Freundin
 Carl Auen as Amtsgerichtsrat
 Gaston Briese as Chauffeur

References

Bibliography 
 
 Klaus, Ulrich J. Deutsche Tonfilme: Jahrgang 1936. Klaus-Archiv, 1988.

External links 
 

1936 films
Films of Nazi Germany
German comedy films
1936 comedy films
1930s German-language films
Films directed by Heinz Paul
German black-and-white films
1930s German films
Films shot at Terra Studios
Terra Film films